Magick is an album of contemporary classical music by American avant-garde composer John Zorn.

Reception
The Allmusic review awarded the album 3½ stars.

Track listing 
All compositions by John Zorn.
 "Necronomicon: Conjurations" - 2:45
 "Necronomicon: The Magus" - 6:24
 "Necronomicon: Thought Forms" - 3:07
 "Necronomicon: Incunabula" - 7:13
 "Necronomicon: Asmodeus" - 3:02
 "Sortilège" - 8:53
Recorded at Hit Factory, New York City

Personnel 
 Tracks 1-5 performed by the Crowley Quartet:
 Jennifer Choi: Violin
 Fred Sherry: Cello
 Jesse Mills: Violin
 Richard O'Neill: Viola
 Track 6 performed by:
 Tim Smith: Bass Clarinet
 Mike Lowenstern: Bass Clarinet

References 

2004 albums
Albums produced by John Zorn
John Zorn albums
Tzadik Records albums